Burned at the Stake, also released as The Coming, is a 1981 film directed by Bert I. Gordon. It stars Susan Swift and Albert Salmi.

Plot

In the Salem of 1692, a group of witches are burned at the stake. Now, in the 1980s, a witch comes back from the dead, possesses one of her descendants, and goes hunting for the occupants of the town to avenge her death.

Cast
 Susan Swift as Loreen Graham / Ann Putnam 
 Albert Salmi as Captain Billingham
 Guy Stockwell as Dr. Grossinger
 Tisha Sterling as Karen Graham
 Beverly Ross as Merlina

References

External links
 

1981 films
Films directed by Bert I. Gordon
Films about reincarnation
Films about witchcraft
1981 horror films
1980s English-language films